Empress Xiaoxianchun (28 March 1712 – 8 April 1748), of the Manchu Bordered Yellow Banner Fuca clan, was the first wife of the Qianlong Emperor. She was empress consort of Qing from 1738 until her death in 1748. Described as a virtuous person and favoured by the Emperor, she did not like spending money for her own good and took her duties seriously when it came to Confucian rituals.

Life

Family background
Empress Xiaoxianchun's personal name was not recorded in history.

 Father: Lirongbao (1674–1723), served as a third rank military official of Chahar, and held the title of a first class duke
 Paternal grandfather: Mishan (1633–1675), served as the Minister of Revenue from 1669 to 1675
 Paternal uncle: Maci (1652–1739)
 Mother: Lady Gioro
 Seven elder brothers and two younger brothers
 Ninth younger brother: Fuheng (1720–1770)
 One younger sister: wife of Salashan

Kangxi era
The future Empress Xiaoxianchun was born on the 22nd day of the second lunar month in the 51st year of the reign of the Kangxi Emperor, which translates to 28 March 1712 in the Gregorian calendar.

Yongzheng era
On 3 September 1727, Lady Fuca married Hongli, the fourth son of the Yongzheng Emperor, and became his primary consort. She then moved into the Palace of Eternal Spring in the western part of the Forbidden City. She gave birth on 3 November 1728 to Hongli's first daughter, who would die prematurely on 14 February 1730, on 9 August 1730 to his second son, Yonglian, who would die due to smallpox on 23 November 1738, and on 31 July 1731 to his third daughter, Princess Hejing of the First Rank.

Qianlong era
The Yongzheng Emperor died on 8 October 1735 and was succeeded by Hongli, who was enthroned as the Qianlong Emperor. On 23 January 1738, Lady Fuca, as the new emperor's primary consort, was instated as empress.

That same year the death of Yonglian struck, the empress was left heartbroken but she remained strong and continued her duties. She managed to hide the fact that she was still in sorrow from everyone but one, her mother-in-law, Empress Dowager Chongqing, who mentioned once that the empress' eyes often looked sad.

In the Draft History of Qing, Lady Fuca is described as a respected and virtuous person. She looked after the Qianlong Emperor and the people in the palace, and served her role as empress well. She was praised and favoured by the emperor. It is also said that Lady Fuca did not like spending money for her own good. Instead of wearing jewellery, she would wear artificial flowers in her hair. The emperor once told her a story that Manchus were too poor to make their own pouches from cloth and had to settle for simple deer hide instead. She immediately made one for him. He was touched by the gift.

Lady Fuca took her duties seriously when it came to Confucian rituals. As head of the harem, she supervised the emperor's consorts when performing a ritual. One of these was a rite concerning sericulture that was presided over by the empress. This rite, which had been practised since the Zhou dynasty, was gradually restored during the reign of Qianlong. For the purpose of the rite, a sericulture altar was completed in 1744, largely at Lady Fuca's urging. That year, she became the first empress in the Qing dynasty to personally lead the women in the palace in these rites. They made offerings of mulberry and presented them to silkworm cocoons, all of them working industriously. In 1751, The whole rite was painted on four scrolls in memory of Lady Fuca.

On 27 May 1746, Lady Fuca gave birth to the emperor's seventh son, Yongcong. The Qianlong Emperor had high hopes for Yongcong and named him the crown prince shortly after his birth. However, Yongcong too would die prematurely on 29 January 1748 due to smallpox, similar to Yonglian. The death of Yongcong caused the empress to be heartbroken once more. All hope for her collapsed, as she became depressed and her health deteriorated.

Death
In 1748, during one of Qianlong's southern tours, she became seriously ill and eventually died on 8 April, 3 months after the death of Yongcong. The empress' funeral was lavishly done. The emperor was deeply affected and did not take it well. When he found out that two of his sons, Yonghuang and Yongzhang, did not mourn for Lady Fuca, he came out with a decree that the both of them would not be allowed to ascend the throne. In addition, court officials who shaved their hair, which was considered disrespectful as it was forbidden to do so throughout the mourning period, were either heavily punished or executed.

Titles
 During the reign of the Kangxi Emperor (r. 1661–1722):
 Lady Fuca (from 28 March 1712)
 During the reign of the Yongzheng Emperor (r. 1722–1735):
 Primary consort (from 3 September 1727)
 During the reign of the Qianlong Emperor (r. 1735–1796):
 Empress (from 23 January 1738)
 Empress Xiaoxian (from 16 June 1748)
 During the reign of the Jiaqing Emperor (r. 1796–1802):
 Empress Xiaoxianchun (from 1799)

Issue
 As primary consort:
 First daughter (3 November 1728 – 14 February 1730)
 Yonglian, Crown Prince Duanhui (9 August 1730 – 23 November 1738), the Qianlong Emperor's second son
 Princess Hejing of the First Rank (31 July 1731 – 30 September 1792), the Qianlong Emperor's third daughter
 Married Septeng Baljur (d. 1775) of the Khorchin Borjigin clan in April/May 1747
 As empress:
 Yongcong, Prince Zhe of First Rank (27 May 1746 – 29 January 1748), the Qianlong Emperor's seventh son

Gallery

In fiction and popular culture
 Portrayed by Shally Tsang in Take Care, Your Highness! (1985)
 Portrayed by Chan Fuk-sang in The Rise and Fall of Qing Dynasty (1988)
 Portrayed by Chen Yi in Jiangshan Weizhong (2002)
 Portrayed by Joyce Tang in The Prince's Shadow (2005)
 Portrayed by Yuan Yi in Empresses in the Palace (2011)
 Portrayed by Qin Lan in Story of Yanxi Palace (2018)
 Portrayed by Dong Jie in Ruyi's Royal Love in the Palace (2018)

See also
 Imperial Chinese harem system
 Royal and noble ranks of the Qing dynasty

Notes

References
 
 
 
 
 

1712 births
1748 deaths
Qing dynasty empresses
Manchu nobility
18th-century Chinese women
18th-century Chinese people
Consorts of the Qianlong Emperor